V728 Scorpii, also known as Nova Scorpii 1862, was a nova that occurred in the constellation of Scorpius.   It was discovered on 4 October 1862 by John Tebbutt, an astronomer living in New South Wales, Australia, while he was observing a comet.  He reported that the star was in the constellation Ara.   At the time of its discovery, the nova had an apparent magnitude of 5, making it visible to the unaided eye.  Nine days later it had faded to below 11th magnitude, indicating that it was a very fast nova.

Tappert et al. conducted an observing program from 2009 to 2011 to investigate nova candidates.   Using photometric and spectroscopic observations, they identified the post-nova star corresponding to Nova Scorpii 1862.   On 20 May 2009, the star had a visible-band magnitude of 18.5.   They reported that the spectrum resembled that of a dwarf nova with a high orbital inclination, suggesting that it might be an eclipsing variable. Follow-up observations by the same team found that V728 Scorpii was indeed an eclipsing system.   All novae are binary stars, in a very close orbit with a "donor" star transferring material to a white dwarf companion.   The eclipses in this system appear to be eclipses of the accretion disk surrounding the white dwarf, rather than either star.   The orbital period is 3.32 hours.

References

Scorpius 1862, Nova
Scorpius (constellation)
Scorpius, V728